Where in the World Is Carmen Sandiego? was an American half-hour children's television game show based on the Carmen Sandiego computer game series created by Broderbund. The show was hosted by Greg Lee, who was joined by Lynne Thigpen, and the a cappella vocal group Rockapella, who served as the show's house band and comedy troupe. The series was videotaped in New York City at Chelsea Studios and Kaufman Astoria Studios (the latter of which also housed the set of Sesame Street) and co-produced by WQED and WGBH-TV, and aired on PBS stations from September 30, 1991, to December 22, 1995, with reruns continuing to air until May 31, 1996. A total of 295 episodes over five seasons were recorded.

The show won seven Daytime Emmys and a 1992 Peabody Award.  In 2001, TV Guide ranked the show at No. 47 on its list of 50 Greatest Game Shows of All Time.

The show was created partially in response to the results of a National Geographic survey that indicated Americans had alarmingly little knowledge of geography, with one in four being unable to locate the Soviet Union or the Pacific Ocean. The show's questions were verified by National Geographic World, who also provided prizes to the contestants in the form of subscriptions to their magazine.

Characters

The Chief
The Chief (Lynne Thigpen) is head of the fictional "ACME Crimenet".  As the de facto announcer for the show, the Chief eloquently uses dialogue rife with puns, alliteration and all forms of word play. The Chief became so popular that Thigpen reprised the role in later editions of the PC games, and also in the subsequent TV series Where in Time Is Carmen Sandiego?

Rockapella
New York City a cappella group Rockapella was the house band for the show and also contributed to the comic relief. During the series run, their lineup included:

Scott Leonard (high tenor)
Sean Altman (tenor)
Elliott Kerman (baritone)
Barry Carl (bass)
Jeff Thacher (vocal percussion; season 5 only)

The group performed the theme music and also brief musical interludes and introductions. They also performed the "think music" during the wager period of the first round and the section where the winner writes where they want to go if they capture Carmen. They also provided brief humorous musical sound effects during the Jail Time Challenge round of the game, as well as background music during the 45-second bonus round.

V.I.L.E. 
V.I.L.E. is Carmen's gang of crooks and the rogues' gallery of ne'er-do-wells comprises the following:
Carmen Sandiego: Master thief, criminal mastermind and the leader of V.I.L.E. During the show's "Phone Tap" segments, she was heard talking to the episode's crook, giving them advice to evade detection. The ultimate goal of the game is to capture Carmen after the crook was caught.
 Vic the Slick: A tactless salesman who wears a loud polyester suit. He also has a seedy moustache, shifty eyes and slicked black hair.
 The Contessa (Appearing in seasons 1, 4 & 5): A so-called criminal of style who fancies herself to be near-royalty.
 Top Grunge: A burly and unkempt biker who was always riding his chopper motorcycle. Dirty and surrounded by flies, he continually sneezed, snorted, and coughed during conversations.
 Eartha Brute: A muscular, dimwitted woman.
 RoboCrook (Unit-059): A cyborg spoof of RoboCop.
 Patty Larceny: A flighty, blonde schoolgirl with a sweet and giggly personality. Her name is a pun on the phrase "petty larceny".
 Double Trouble: A pair of Yin and Yang party-boy twins with quarter moon-shaped heads. They speak in a voice similar to Jack Nicholson.
 Kneemoi (Introduced in season 2): A shape-shifting alien from the planet Roddenberry. Her name is a reference to Leonard Nimoy best known for playing Spock of Star Trek and her home planet to the franchise's creator Gene Roddenberry.
 Wonder Rat (Introduced in season 2): A superhero parody who wears a makeshift rat costume.
 Sarah Nade (Introduced in season 3): A loud, obnoxious teenage punk rocker with rainbow-colored hair. Her name is a pun on the word "serenade".

Gameplay

Each episode consisted of three middle-school-aged contestants (10–14 years of age) competing against one another answering geography-related trivia questions to determine the location of one of Carmen Sandiego's cronies and eventually Carmen herself. Throughout the program the contestants are referred to as "gumshoes", in reference to fledgling detectives just starting out in the profession.

Round One
After Lee meets the day's gumshoes at the beginning of the show, the Chief briefs them on the crime and the crook who committed it, often adding the crook's reason for committing the crime.  The gumshoes began with 50 ACME Crime Bucks each. Assorted live action, celebrity, musical, animated, and costumed comedy sketches were performed, each providing clues to a geographical location of the day's crook. A map with three possible locations was shown on-screen to the gumshoes, Lee reminded them of the clues, and each gumshoe chose an answer. Ten Crime Bucks were added to each gumshoe's score for a correct answer, and there was no penalty for a wrong guess.

Various elements of the first round included:
The Lightning Round: Partway through round one, a thunderclap/lightning effect played in the office signaling the start of the Lightning Round. Three toss-up questions, all multiple-choice related to the area in the previous question, were asked to the gumshoes, and each right answer earned five more Crime Bucks. This section, along with The Chase, required the gumshoes to use their buzzers to answer questions.
Chief's Office:  After the Lightning Round, the Chief called Lee into her office for a brief conference. This was used as a comedy break, during which the Chief and Lee engaged in a brief skit, usually brought to a close by either announcing the show's grand prize: a trip to anywhere in the Continental United States (beginning in season 2, the prize was expanded to include anywhere in North America) to the gumshoe who captured Carmen Sandiego by the end of the episode (seasons 1 and 2), or they described a home viewer contest in which viewers could win a Carmen Sandiego T-shirt, and some winners of the home viewer contest (season 3 onward).
Training Exercise (Season 5 only): In this game (which began in between the Chief's Office and the Phone Tap), the gumshoes were each given a trash can to rummage through to find a card; each card providing a different clue for another location. After all of the clues were read, the first gumshoe to find their card and re-close their trash can got the first chance to answer, the right answer earning ten Crime Bucks.
Phone Tap:  After visiting the Chief's office (or after the Training Exercise in season 5) and returning to the game set, Lee played a "Phone tap" recording for the gumshoes on the game monitor: in it, Carmen conversed with the crook of the day, providing more clues for another location to which the crook has gone.
The Chase (beginning in season 2): Similar to the "Lightning Round", and also requiring contestants to answer with their buzzers, Lee asked a series of five toss-up questions which provided clues about locations that followed a path, indicating that the gumshoes were hot on the trail of the crook; each correct answer earned five Crime Bucks. (This segment was introduced with a brief chase skit performed by Rockapella comically running across the stage, sometimes accompanied by others, including Lee, the Chief, some stagehands, and even members of the studio audience.)
The Final Clue:  To end the first round, Lee showed the gumshoes a map of three locations to where the crook may have traveled. Before the clues were given, Lee gave them a few seconds (during which Rockapella sang special "think music") to wager up to 50 of their Crime Bucks, in increments of 10 (or they could risk nothing), on their answer. The final clue was then given, and the gumshoes were allowed to pick and set aside their answer. Starting with the lowest scoring gumshoe up to that point, each gumshoe then first revealed their wager and then their answer. Their wager was added to their score if they answered correctly, but deducted from their score if incorrect. At round's end, the lowest scoring gumshoe received consolation prizes from the Chief and was eliminated from the game.

If the first round ended in a tie for second place, Lee read clues related to a famous person or place (typically a U.S. state). Gumshoes could buzz in as often as they wanted; the first gumshoe to buzz in with the correct answer received an additional five Crime Bucks and moved on to Round 2. Generally speaking, the last clue contained the answer. If the round ended in a three-way tie, then Lee read two tiebreaker questions and only two gumshoes were tied and moved on to the next round.

Round Two: Jail Time Challenge
The two higher scoring gumshoes continued on to Round Two, following the crook to their next destination (the same destination described in the Final Clue from Round One). The Chief briefed the two on their destination, using a "Photo Recon" to describe different landmarks and venues in the location from the final question of the first round.  Fifteen trilons were then displayed on a large game board, each one labeled with the name of a different landmark, including those shown during the Chief's briefing.  Hidden behind three of the trilons were the day's stolen loot, an arrest warrant, and the crook him/herself, and behind the other twelve were shoe prints, which indicated nothing was there.

The higher of the two scoring gumshoes from round one chose first. If the two gumshoes were tied for first place, a coin toss determined who started. The gumshoes then alternated taking turns until one of them found all three of the key items in the required order:

First, the loot, the evidence required for the warrant,
Second, the warrant to arrest the crook, and
Third, only after finding the loot and the warrant, the crook him/herself

Finding either the loot, warrant, or crook at any time allowed the gumshoe to take another turn, but if one of these was found in the incorrect order (such as if the crook was uncovered before either the loot or warrant were) Lee would remind the gumshoe that the items needed to be found in the correct order and the gumshoe therefore would have to choose a space that was blank and pass control.

At round's end, the winning gumshoe pulled a ring on a chain rope, activating a foghorn and incarcerating the crook. A consolation prize was announced by the Chief to the losing and departing gumshoe, after which Lee reminded the winning gumshoe of the grand prize.

Bonus Round: Carmen's World Map
At the end of the second round, Lee then handed a portfolio to the winning gumshoe for them to secretly write down their chosen destination if they were to win the grand prize in the Bonus Round, after which the gumshoe received a phone call from the apprehended crook, who instructed them to look for Carmen on a certain continent: Asia, Africa, Europe, South America or the United States (the latter of which expanded to include the rest of North America beginning in season 3), and the Chief then gave a list of thirteen locations on the chosen continent.

Lee and the gumshoe then moved to a giant map that covered the entire floor in front of the studio audience. The map showed small red circles denoting cities of countries or states, and later added red arrows marking bodies of water and red squares for national parks and monuments.

To capture Carmen, the gumshoe had to identify seven different locations on the map (eight beginning in season 2) in 45 seconds or less, each time grabbing one of a set of large markers with police beacons mounted on top, and quickly placing the marker on one of the red spots on the map. If they correctly identified a location, the beacon on the marker flashed and a police siren sounded briefly, while incorrect guesses were marked by a two-note "uh-oh" buzzer; one incorrect guess per location was allowed, but a second incorrect guess forced the gumshoe to leave the marker behind and go on to the next location. What made the round especially challenging was that the map was upside down from the gumshoe's perspective. If the gumshoe succeeded, they won the grand prize of the trip; Lee then revealed the location the gumshoe wrote down in the portfolio. If the gumshoe failed to capture Carmen, they received a consolation prize but the trip destination was not revealed. Regardless of the result, the Chief promoted the gumshoe to "sleuth" with her congratulations.

Production
A staff of 150 worked to produce the show. Each season was produced in six weeks. Typically three to four episodes were taped each shooting day in a New York studio. Producers contacted local New York schools and considered children aged 8–13; entrants were required to take a geography test. Prospective contestants who passed the test were then interviewed by producers.

Original music and theme song

All of the music on the series (including assorted short stings and stagers) was arranged and performed by Rockapella. The theme song played in full over the animated end credits as the studio audience danced to the music on the map, and in later episodes the audience joined in singing along. The main theme song was written by Rockapella co-founder Sean Altman and David Yazbek, and appears on the 1992 soundtrack album Where in the World Is Carmen Sandiego? and also in the compilation Television's Greatest Hits Volume 7: Cable Ready (TVT 1996).

Animation
Graphic designer Gene Mackles recalled: "I took on the assignment to produce about 2 hours of animation for the [show]. With a ridiculously tight deadline and budget, the only possibility for this to work at the time involved purchasing half a dozen Macintosh computers and assembling a team of animators using Macromind Director to get it to happen. Amazingly enough it worked, and Chris Pullman and I won a daytime Emmy for our effort". All the animated characters were created on the Mac.

Geopolitical changes
Following the completion of taping for the first season, massive geopolitical changes in the world—including the dissolution of the Soviet Union and the breakup of Yugoslavia—rendered the entire season geographically inaccurate. Starting in the second season, a disclaimer aired in the closing stating "All geographic information was accurate as of the date this program was recorded."

Critical reception
NerdHQ deemed the series the "crown jewel" of the Carmen Sandiego franchise.

Awards and nominations
Aside from the aforementioned Emmy and Peabody wins, the show was nominated for several other awards.

International versions
Disney's Buena Vista Productions International (BVPI) co-produced the series in Germany with MDR in Chemnitz (formerly Karl-Marx-Stadt) where it aired on national broadcaster ARD and was entitled Jagd um die Welt – Schnappt Carmen Sandiego! (Chase Around the World: Catch Carmen Sandiego!) in 1994. In the same year, BVPI also co-produced the Italian series in Naples with national broadcaster RAI (entitled Che fine ha fatto Carmen Sandiego?, "What has come of Carmen Sandiego?"), and also co-produced the Spanish version, Dónde se esconde Carmen Sandiego, ("Where is Carmen Sandiego hiding?") which was co-produced in Valencia with national broadcaster TVE in 1995.

Canada's Télé-Québec produced a French-language version called Mais, où se cache Carmen Sandiego? (But, Where is Carmen Sandiego Hiding?), which aired between 1995 and 1998 and stars Pauline Martin as "The Chief" and Martin Drainville as the ACME Agent in Charge of Training New Recruits.

A French version produced by Marina Productions, also entitled Mais où se cache Carmen Sandiego?, was launched in April 1995 and aired Sundays on France 3.

There was also a New Zealand version of Carmen Sandiego that lasted from 1996 to 1999. Radio Television of Malaysia produced their own iteration of the show in 1998 titled Di Mana Joe Jambul (Where Is Pompadour Joe). In this version, contestants composed of two teams of three kids try to find clues and stop Pompadour Joe and his gang's criminal activities around the world. The show was rebooted in 2012 with a new set, animation and rules.

References

External links

 
 Where in the World Is Carmen Sandiego? at kyranthia
 Where In The World Is Carmen Sandiego? at seanaltman.com
 Where in the World Is Carmen Sandiego at everything2.com
 Where in the World Is Carmen Sandiego at tvrecaps
 Where in the World Is Carmen Sandiego at sharetv

1991 American television series debuts
1995 American television series endings
1990s American children's game shows
PBS original programming
Live action television shows based on video games
Peabody Award-winning television programs
Television shows filmed in New York City
Television series by WGBH
American television shows based on video games
English-language television shows
Carmen Sandiego TV shows
PBS Kids shows
American television series with live action and animation
American children's education television series